This article describes the party affiliations of leaders of each member-state represented in the European Council during the year 2008. The list below gives the political party that each head of government, or head of state, belongs to at the national level, as well as the European political alliance to which that national party belongs. The states are listed from most to least populous. More populous states have greater influence in the council, in accordance with the system of Qualified Majority Voting.



Summary

List of leaders (1 January 2008)

 Prodi's Democratic Party had yet to determine which European party it would belong to. Prodi's political background was on the Democracy is Freedom – The Daisy side of the PD's ancestry, and he personally was honorary president of Daisy's European parent, the EDP.
 Supported by PD-L
 DIKO's MEP is a member of the Alliance of Liberals and Democrats for Europe group in the European Parliament, but the party is not formally attached to any pan-European organization.

Changes

Affiliation

 AKEL holds only observer status with the Party of the European Left.

Office-holder only

See also
Presidency of the Council of the European Union

External links
Council of the European Union (official website)

Lists of parties in the European Council